Harold Bloomer (September 13, 1902 – September 16, 1965) was an American fencer. He competed in the individual foil event at the 1924 Summer Olympics.

References

External links
 

1902 births
1965 deaths
American male foil fencers
Olympic fencers of the United States
Fencers at the 1924 Summer Olympics
Sportspeople from New York City
People from Riverside, Connecticut